Saligram Jaiswal (9 December 1907 – 28 December 1981) was a freedom fighter and socialist politician from Prayagraj, Uttar Pradesh in India. 

He was also a Health Minister in the Government of Uttar Pradesh, under Hemwati Nandan Bahuguna, though he resigned from his position in 1974 after the government reinstated land revenue for land holdings up to 6.25 acres.

Career
He was a member of Indian National Congress, where he was the secretary of District Congress Committee from 1932 to 1942. In 1934, he was elected a member of Allahabad Municipal Board along with K. D. Malviya, Lal Bahadur Shastri and Vijay Lakshmi Pandit.

Subsequently, he joined the Praja Socialist Party and was its president during the Allahabad convention. Later, he joined the breakaway Samyukta Socialist Party (SSP) and was a member of its National Executive. In 1970, he was the unanimous SSP nominee to contest the election for Mayor of Allahabad, though he stood as an independent. However, he lost the election to another independent caditate, S. N. Kacker, by two votes.

References 

1907 births
1981 deaths
Uttar Pradesh politicians
Praja Socialist Party politicians
20th-century Indian politicians
Politicians from Allahabad
State cabinet ministers of Uttar Pradesh
Indian National Congress politicians from Uttar Pradesh
Members of the Uttar Pradesh Legislative Assembly